Broadsheet was a monthly New Zealand feminist magazine produced in Auckland from 1972 to 1997. The magazine played a significant part in New Zealand women's activism. It was to become one of the world's longest-lived feminist magazines.

It was co-founded by Anne Else, Sandra Coney, Rosemary Ronald, and Kitty Wishart. The magazine was "New Zealand's first feminist magazine focusing on women's issues and information sharing on a national and international level".

The first issue was released in July 1972, and "consisted of twelve foolscap pages – stapled"; 200 copies were produced, which sold out. Before the second issue was published they had 50 paid subscribers.

Māori issues sometimes received considerable coverage in the magazine, which provoked "fierce exchanges in the letters pages".

On 19 September 1992, the magazine and New Women's Press (NWP) celebrated a joint anniversary (Broadsheet'''s twentieth and NWP's tenth), with a Suffrage Day event in Auckland, attended by more than 200 women. The event was part of the Listener Women's Book Festival. Speakers included Pat Rosier, Sandra Coney, Wendy Harrex, Stephanie Johnson and Sheridan Keith.

The magazine is now an important source for the social history of the period, and the entire back catalogue of Broadsheet is available on the University of Auckland website.

Notes

References

Rosier, Pat (ed.), Been Around for Quite a While: Twenty Years of Broadsheet Magazine, New Women's Press, Auckland, 1992
Coney, Sandra, 'Broadsheet, Ten Years On', Broadsheet, No. 101, July/August 1981, pp. 12–19
Daly, Carmel, 'Broadsheet Collective 1972–1997', Women Together,'' NZHistory website.

External links
Broadsheet, New Zealand’s Feminist Magazine, 1972–1997, The University of Auckland, online access.
Information about the 'Broadsheet Row' at TheProw.org.nz
Broadsheet, New Zealand’s Feminist Magazine Goes Digital, designassembly.co.nz

Defunct magazines published in New Zealand
Feminism in New Zealand
Feminist magazines
Magazines established in 1972
Magazines disestablished in 1997
Monthly magazines published in New Zealand
Women's magazines published in New Zealand
Mass media in Auckland